Alessandro Arrigoni (Barzio, Province of Como, 1764 - 1819) was an Italian painter, mainly depicting still lifes with flowers. Gottardo states that he died by suicide. A Catalogue of the Brera Academy states he was born in Valassina in 1752.

References

1764 births
1819 deaths
People from the Province of Como
18th-century Italian painters
Italian male painters
19th-century Italian painters
Italian still life painters
19th-century Italian male artists
18th-century Italian male artists